James Q. Whitman is an American lawyer and Ford Foundation Professor of Comparative and Foreign Law at Yale University.

Biography 
Whitman is the son of investor and philanthropist Martin J. Whitman. He also has a sister, Tony Award-winning producer Barbara Whitman.

He graduated from Yale University with a BA in 1980 and a JD in 1988, from Columbia University with a MA in 1982, and from the University of Chicago with a PhD in 1987. He was a Guggenheim Fellow. In 2015, he was awarded a doctorate honoris causa by the KU Leuven (Catholic University of Leuven)

Whitman's 2017 book, Hitler's American Model: The United States and the Making of Nazi Race Law, received wide coverage in the news and academia. Neoconservative scholar Joshua Muravchik dismissed the book as mere reductio ad Hitlerum.

In 2017, he was elected a Fellow of the American Academy of Arts and Sciences (AASS).

Works
 
  
  
 "The Two Western Cultures of Privacy: Dignity versus Liberty",  Yale Law Journal, Vol. 113, April 2004 
 The Legacy of Roman Law in the German Romantic Era: Historical Vision and Legal Change, Princeton University Press, 1990, 
 Hitler’s American Model: The United States and the Making of Nazi Race Law. Princeton University Press, 2017. 
 Synopsis: a historical analysis of the ways in which Nazi Germany was influenced by and modeled its policies after the United States during the 1930s. Whitman argues that the Nazis were particularly interested in the racial segregation and anti-miscegenation laws that were prevalent in many American states, as well as the brutal tactics used by American law enforcement to control minority populations. These policies served as a template for the Nazis' own persecution of Jews and other minority groups during the Holocaust. Whitman also explores the ways in which American eugenics theory influenced the Nazi regime's ideas about racial purity and the superiority of the Aryan race.
 Why the Nazis studied American race laws for inspiration. Aeon, 13 December 2016

References

American lawyers
Yale University faculty
Stanford Law School faculty
Columbia Graduate School of Arts and Sciences alumni
University of Chicago alumni
Yale Law School alumni
Living people
Year of birth missing (living people)